The Municipality of Hajdina is a small municipality on the right bank of the Drava River near Ptuj in northeastern Slovenia. Its administrative seat is the village of Zgornja Hajdina. The area is part of the traditional region of Styria. The municipality is now included in the Drava Statistical Region. Sights include relics of the Roman settlement of Poetovio and the parish church of Saint Martin in Zgornja Hajdina.

Settlements
In addition to the municipal seat of Zgornja Hajdina, the municipality also includes the following settlements:
 Draženci
 Gerečja Vas
 Hajdoše
 Skorba
 Slovenja Vas
 Spodnja Hajdina

References

External links

Municipality of Hajdina on Geopedia
Hajdina municipal site

 
Hajdina
1998 establishments in Slovenia